Gleason Leonard Archer Jr. (May 22, 1916 – April 27, 2004) was a biblical scholar, theologian, educator and author.

Early life
Gleason Archer was born in Norwell, Massachusetts in 1916 and became a Christian at a young age through the influence of his mother, Elizabeth Archer. His maternal grandfather was a pastor. Archer's father was Gleason Archer Sr., the founder of Suffolk Law School in Boston. Archer grew up in Boston and spent summers in Norwell. He graduated from Boston Latin School and in 1938 he graduated from Harvard University with a BA (summa cum laude in Classics). He received an LL.B. from Suffolk Law School in Boston in 1939, the same year he was admitted to the Massachusetts bar. In 1940 he received a master's degree from Harvard and in 1944 he was awarded a PhD at Harvard University in Classics. Finally he received his Bachelor of Divinity from Princeton Theological Seminary in 1945.

Career
Archer served as an assistant pastor of Park Street Church in Boston from 1945 to 1948. He then became a Professor of Biblical Languages at Fuller Theological Seminary in Pasadena, California from 1948 to 1965. From 1965 to 1986 he served as a Professor of Old Testament and Semitics at Trinity Evangelical Divinity School, Deerfield, Illinois. He became an emeritus faculty member in 1989. The remainder of his life was spent researching, writing, and lecturing.

Archer served as one of the 50 original translators of the NASB published in 1971. He also worked on the team which translated the NIV Bible published in 1978. His defense of the doctrine of Biblical inerrancy by proposing harmonizations and exegesis regarding inconsistencies in the Bible made Archer a well known biblical inerrantist. He stated: "One cannot allow for error in history-science without also ending up with error in doctrine." He was critical of the documentary hypothesis which denies the Mosaic authorship of the Pentateuch. Archer also maintained that the prophet Isaiah wrote the entire book of Isaiah; he wrote regarding this issue: "There is not a shred of internal evidence to support the theory of a Second Isaiah, apart from a philosophical prejudice against the possibility of predictive prophecy."

Works

Books

References

Reference works

1916 births
2004 deaths
20th-century evangelicals
21st-century evangelicals
American Christian theologians
American biblical scholars
American evangelicals
Fuller Theological Seminary faculty
Harvard College alumni
Old Testament scholars
Princeton Theological Seminary alumni
Suffolk University Law School alumni
Trinity International University faculty
Writers from Boston